Chernoyarova House is an old mansion in Taganrog, built in the second half of the 19th century. It is officially declared as an object of cultural heritage of Russia of Regional importance.

History 
The one-storey house on Grecheskaya Street in Taganrog was built in the second half of the 19th century. At the end of the 19th century an at the beginning of the 20th century, starting from Chernoyarova House and further, up to the Dvortsovy alley, the right side of Grecheskaya Street began to be built up by capital structures in accordance with the recommendations from the Collection of facades of His Imperial Majesty, approved by Emperor of Russia for private buildings in the cities of the Russian Empire.

Chernoyarova House before Revolution of 1917 was the property of the nobleman's wife, Olga Nikolaevna Chernoyarova. Her husband, Alexei Fedorovich, retired major general, died on 20 May 1910, at the age of 80.

During the Soviet era, the building was nationalized.

Architecture 
The house has five windows on the side of the facade. The house is built of brick in an asymmetric form. It has a gable roof, and the side walls have windows without ornaments. The basement of the building is painted dark-brown, the first floor ― in light brown, small architectural elements are highlighted in white. The building has an inter-floor cornice. The three right narrow windows are decorated with Pilasters, rectangular sandricks; a triangular pediment and an attic stand out above the windows. The facade of the building is plastered, its side walls are lined with red brick.

References

Literature 
 Гаврюшкин О. П. По старой Греческой... (Хроника обывательской жизни). — Таганрог: Лукоморье, 2003. — 514 с. — .

External links 
 Chernoyarova House

Cultural heritage monuments in Taganrog
Buildings and structures in Taganrog
Cultural heritage monuments of regional significance in Rostov Oblast